Bulindo is a neighborhood in Kira Municipality, Kyaddondo County, Wakiso District, in the Central Region of Uganda.

Location
Bulindo is bordered by Nakweero to the north, Kitukutwe to the northeast, Kigulu to the east, Mulawa to the south, Kitikifumba to the southwest, and Kazinga to the west. The coordinates of Bulindo are 0°25'14.0"N, 32°38'43.0"E (Latitude:0.420556; Longitude:32.645278).

Overview
Before 2001, Bulindo was a residential and farming village. In 2001, a law was passed incorporating the village into the newly created Kira municipality, the second largest urban center in Uganda, with an estimated population of about 180,000 in 2011. Since 2000, Bulindo has developed into a middle-class residential neighbourhood, with planned housing developments and large private farms and ranches. Bulindo is connected to the national power grid and the water pipeline of the National Water and Sewerage Corporation.

Points of interest
The Kira-Nakweero road passes through Bulindo in a general north to south direction.

See also
 Nsasa

References

External links
 Uganda: New Shimoni Teachers' College Opens in Kira Town

Kira Town
Populated places in Central Region, Uganda
Cities in the Great Rift Valley